Sonia Aquino (born 10 July 1977 in Avellino) is an Italian actress.

Biography 
A theatre, cinema and television actress, Aquino graduated from the National School of the Cinema (Scuola Nazionale di Cinema) in Rome and attended Francesca De Sapio's Duse Studio. She studied also performing arts at the theatre "Bellini" in Naples, taking part in some stages held by Peter Del Monte, Marco Bellocchio, and Maurizio Nichetti. She most notably appeared in the movie The Life and Death of Peter Sellers as Sophia Loren.

Filmography

Cinema 
Marquise (1997)
Il fratello minore (2000) - Role: Ragazza sexy
Amici Ahrarara (2001) - Role: Maura
L'italiano (2002) - Role: Luisa
The Life and Death of Peter Sellers, by Stephen Hopkins (2004) - Role: Sophia Loren
Signora (2004) - Role: Sarah
Casa Eden (2004)
Viva Franconi (2006)

Television 
Deserto di fuoco Mini-series TV (1997)
Vivere - Role: Caterina
Il bambino di Betlemme (2002) - TV film
Imperium: Nerone Mini-series TV - Role: Messalina
Il Cuore nel Pozzo Mini-series TV (2005) - Role: Giulia
Carabinieri - TV series (2005–2008)
Nati ieri - TV series (2006–2007)
Un dottore quasi perfetto TV film - Role: Francesca Nocetti
Incantesimo 9-10 Soap Opera - Role: Rossella Natoli
Don Matteo 6, TV series - Role: Vanessa
I Cesaroni 3 - TV series (2009)
Sant'Agostino (2009)
Storia di una famiglia per bene (2021) TV mini-series - Role: Angelica Straziota

External links 
 

People from Avellino
1977 births
Italian actresses
Living people